Bayside Church is an Australia church in fellowship with Crosslink Christian Network. The church is based in the Melbourne Bayside suburbs of Cheltenham and Frankston.  The church’s founding senior pastors are Rob and Christie Buckingham.

Whilst the headquarters of Bayside Church is in Cheltenham, the church is multi-location, with a congregation in Frankston also. In 2011, new premises were established in Carrum Downs which is located in the Frankston municipality (this closed in 2021).

History
In June 1992, Rob Buckingham started Bayside Church at WD Rose & Sons Funeral Chapel in Cheltenham.  After a year, the church moved into a hall at Cheltenham Primary School. By 1994 a third move was made and Mentone Secondary College became Bayside’s home for seven years. During this time Bayside Church consisted of 300 congregational members.

In 1999, a printing factory in Cheltenham was purchased and building plans began for Bayside Church's permanent residence.  The Bayside Centre opened in August 2000, home of Bayside Church Cheltenham location.

Bayside Church continued to grow to incorporate three services - Saturday night, Sunday morning and Sunday evening. In November 2005, a new location in Frankston opened kick-starting the vision of multi-locations in the Bayside suburbs.

Media
In 2002, a media production arm of Bayside Church was born.  Bayside Media produces an engaging TV show "The Exchange".  The Exchange is broadcast on C31 Melbourne, Australian Christian Channel as well as internationally on United Kingdom’s UCB. www.theexchangetv.com.au

Beliefs 
Bayside Church is a non-denominational Pentecostal church which is affiliated with Crosslink Christian Network, an Australian based group of Churches and Christian Ministries.  The Church’s beliefs are evangelical and Pentecostal in that they "wholeheartedly" believe that the Bible is the inspired, infallible and authoritative written Word of God (2 Tim 3:16; 2 Peter 1:19-21). They also hold that there is one God, eternally existent in three persons, God the Father, God the Son, and God the Holy Spirit (Matt 28:19; 2 Cor 13:14), and that Jesus Christ, as the son of God, reconciled humanity through his death and resurrection and that everyone is invited to accept this gift of salvation.  The Church also believes that salvation can only take place with the regenerative work of the Holy Spirit and that the baptism of the Holy Spirit is given to believers who ask. The Holy Spirit also gives supernatural gifts to believers.

Rob Buckingham
Until the age of 19, Rob Buckingham was a self-professed atheist and didn't think too highly of Christians. While hitchhiking around Australia, Rob had a near-death experience in a truck as it collided with another truck.  Both the driver and Rob survived the ordeal, but the occupants in the other truck, unfortunately, didn't.

After leaving the hospital, Rob was invited to stay with the truck driver’s family.  They were devout Christians and decided to challenge his perception that God was nonexistent. Shortly after Rob attended their church and committed his life to Jesus.
Rob became a popular professional breakfast announcer on 6GE in Geraldton, Western Australia. In 1984, Rob was called to pastoral ministry and attended Commonwealth Bible College in Katoomba, NSW, where he trained to become an ordained pastor.
In 1988, Rob moved to Melbourne to become an Assistant Pastor at Lighthouse Church in Keysborough serving as Minister of Christian Education.

Despite his call to Christian ministry, Rob continued to work in radio and worked at 3MP for 15 years and hosted 3MP's Rob Buckingham and Friends program each Sunday from 1993 to 1999. He interviewed guests such as Whitney Houston, Lionel Richie as well as many well-known community figures.

In 1992, Rob started a church in Cheltenham which he commenced with a small group of people. The church has grown to 2,000 in 2013.

In 1994 Rob Buckingham married Christie McClay and together they have led Bayside Church.

In December 2002 Rob began working with Melbourne's new Christian radio station, Light FM, where he worked as Music Director for many years.

References

Pentecostal churches in Melbourne
Evangelical megachurches in Australia
Christian organizations established in 1992
Buildings and structures in the City of Bayside